Calvin Parker MacDonald (June 14, 1933 — August 17, 2017) was a Canadian professional ice hockey left winger who played for five National Hockey League teams between 1953 and 1969. He later coached the Minnesota North Stars and the Los Angeles Kings.

Playing career
MacDonald played in the Ontario Hockey Association for the Toronto Marlboros in the 1951–52 season and starting turning heads. He was a natural goal-scorer but the management felt he needed time to blossom. He made his NHL debut in 1952, playing one game for the Toronto Maple Leafs. The management liked what they saw and promoted MacDonald to the AHL the following season. There MacDonald played for the Pittsburgh Hornets until he finally earned full-time status with the Leafs in 1954. After that season the New York Rangers plucked MacDonald from the Leafs' roster in the Intra-League Draft, where he continued to be shuffled between the Rangers and their AHL affiliates. When New York finally gave up on MacDonald, he sought out a doctor to examine his chronically sore shoulder and was surprised to find that a chunk of metal was still embedded in it, the result of a broken drill left in him from a previous operation.

Following this news, the Detroit Red Wings decided to take a chance and grabbed MacDonald in the 1960 Intra-League Draft. That season he found his stride and reached his full potential playing centre on a line with Gordie Howe and Alex Delvecchio of the famed "Production line". He had a career year in the 1962–63 season when he scored 33 goals with eight of those being game winning goals. MacDonald would remain with the Wings until May 31, 1965 when he was traded to the Boston Bruins along with Albert Langlois, Ron Harris and Bob Dillabough for Ab McDonald, Bob McCord and Ken Stephanson, only to be traded back for Pit Martin after just half a season.

During the 1967 Expansion Draft, MacDonald was chosen by the Minnesota North Stars 18th overall. He would contribute 62 points, including 9 in the playoffs to the Stars in two seasons. He retired in 1969, with 323 career NHL points in 676 games played.

Coaching
Following his retirement, MacDonald became a player-coach for the Iowa Stars of the Central Hockey League and led them to a 35–26–11 record, losing in the finals. He moved on to coaching full-time with the New Haven Nighthawks for a year and then returned to his former team in the NHL, Minnesota, as head coach. He performed well with the North Stars but decided to return to coaching the Nighthawks, as the pressure was too great. He would coach the Nighthawks for the next five seasons, always with a winning record but always losing in the playoffs, including losing in the finals twice. He even received the Louis A.R. Pieri Memorial Award for the AHL's best coach after the 1978–79 season. He decided to give the NHL one more shot as he accepted an assistant coaching position for the Los Angeles Kings in 1980 followed by the head coach position in the 1981–82 season. MacDonald retired midway through the season with a record of 13–24–5.

Career statistics

Regular season and playoffs

Coaching record

Awards
 AHL Second All-Star Team (1956, 1960)
 Louis A.R. Pieri Memorial Award (1978–79)
 Elected to the Cape Breton Sports Hall of Fame (1987).

References

External links
 

1933 births
2017 deaths
Canadian ice hockey coaches
Canadian ice hockey left wingers
Canadian people of Scottish descent
Boston Bruins players
Buffalo Bisons (AHL) players
Detroit Red Wings players
Hershey Bears players
Ice hockey people from Nova Scotia
Los Angeles Kings coaches
Minnesota North Stars coaches
Minnesota North Stars players
New York Rangers players
People from Sydney, Nova Scotia
Pittsburgh Hornets players
Providence Reds players
Sportspeople from the Cape Breton Regional Municipality
Springfield Indians players
Toronto Maple Leafs players
Toronto Marlboros players